Peptoclostridium litorale, previously known as Clostridium litorale, is a bacterium belonging to the family Peptostreptococcaceae.

References

Peptostreptococcaceae
Bacteria described in 1991